, is a sub-kilometer asteroid and suspected tumbler, classified as a near-Earth object and potentially hazardous asteroid of the Aten group, approximately  in diameter. It was discovered on 12 June 2002, by astronomers of the Lincoln Near-Earth Asteroid Research at the Lincoln Laboratory's Experimental Test Site near Socorro, New Mexico, in the United States.

Orbit and classification 

 orbits the Sun at a distance of 0.6–1.1 AU once every 9 months (284 days; semi-major axis of 0.85 AU). Its orbit has an eccentricity of 0.31 and an inclination of 6° with respect to the ecliptic.

The body's observation arc begins with a precovery taken at AMOS on 10 June 2002, two nights prior to its official discovery observation at Lincoln Lab's ETS.

Close approaches 

It will pass at that distance during its close encounter with Earth on 27 June 2030.

Physical characteristics 

The asteroid is an assumed stony S-type asteroid.

Rotation period 

Lightcurve analysis gave a longer-than average rotation period of 21.80 hours with a brightness variation of 1.16 magnitude. A high brightness amplitude typically indicates that the body has a non-spherical, elongated shape. It is also a suspected tumbler.

Diameter and albedo 

The Collaborative Asteroid Lightcurve Link assumes a standard albedo for stony asteroids of 0.20 and calculates a diameter of 0.236 kilometers based on an absolute magnitude of 20.5.

Numbering and naming 

This minor planet was numbered by the Minor Planet Center on 21 May 2016, after its orbit determination became sufficiently secure. As of 2018, it has not been named.

Notes

References

External links 
 List Of Aten Minor Planets (by designation), Minor Planet Center
 List of the Potentially Hazardous Asteroids (PHAs), Minor Planet Center
 PHA Close Approaches To The Earth, Minor Planet Center
 Asteroid Lightcurve Database (LCDB), query form (info )
 Asteroids and comets rotation curves, CdR – Observatoire de Genève, Raoul Behrend
 
 
 

467336
467336
467336
20230624
20020612